Amb. Aden Sheikh Hassan or Aden Sheikh Hassan Nuriye  also referred to as His Excelleny H.E Aden Sheikh,was a  prominent ambassador for Djibouti. Aden Sheikh Hassan was 1 of the 3 ambassadorial brothers from Ethiopia, Djibouti and Somalia, all ethnic Somalis, the other 2 brothers were  Mohamed Sheikh Hassan and Ismail Sheikh Hassan, all from the same prominent family. The first time in history 3 Somali brothers managed to become ambassadors in 3 neighboring countries.

History 
Aden hails from a prominent family. They are known as the Ambassadorial Brothers. His father Sheikh Hassan Nuriye was a prominent Sheikh in Ethiopia, Djibouti and Somaliland. Sheikh Hassan had sired three sons who represented three African countries at ambassadorial level. Mohamed brothers are Mohamed Sheikh Hassan who represented Somalia at ambassadorial level and was the ambassador for Somalia to Canada, Nigeria and South Africa. His other brother Ismail Sheikh Hassan was the Djiboutian ambassador to Oman and the Kingdom of Saudi Arabia. Aden Sheikh Hassan belongs to the Rer Ughaz (Reer Ugaas), Makahiildheere (Makahildere), subsection of the Makahiil (Makahil) branch of the Gadabursi (Gadabuursi).  Mohamed served his country as ambassador to Canada and afterwards ambassador to Nigeria and South Africa.

Below is a quote from a Djiboutian source which mentions the ambassador presenting his credentials to the Sultanate of Oman.

Career 
 Ambassador for Djibouti to Oman
 Ambassador for Djibouti to Saudi Arabia
 Current Adviser to the President of Djibouti, Ismail Omar Guelleh

Family tree 
 Sheikh Hassan Nuriye, Father of all 3 Ambassadors and prominent Sheikh in all 3 countries
 Mohamed Sheikh Hassan - Ambassador for Somalia to United Arab Republic,  Canada and Nigeria
 Ismail Sheikh Hassan - Ambassador for Ethiopia to Libya
 Aden Sheikh Hassan - Ambassador for Djibouti to Oman and Saudi Arabia

References

Djiboutian diplomats
Gadabuursi